Epeolus mesillae is a species of cuckoo bee in the family Apidae.

Subspecies
These two subspecies belong to the species Epeolus mesillae:
 Epeolus mesillae mesillae (Cockerell, 1895)
 Epeolus mesillae palmarum Linsley, 1939

References

Further reading

 

Nomadinae
Articles created by Qbugbot
Insects described in 1895